Penicillium caseifulvum is a fungus species of the genus of Penicillium which occurs on the surface of blue cheese and causes discoloration in form of brown spots.

See also
List of Penicillium species

References

Further reading
 

caseifulvum
Fungi described in 1998